Olga Yatskovets (born October 16, 1997) is a Ukrainian basketball player for BC Avanhard Kyiv and the Ukrainian national team.

She participated at the EuroBasket Women 2017.

References

1997 births
Living people
Ukrainian women's basketball players
Power forwards (basketball)
People from Berdiansk
Sportspeople from Zaporizhzhia Oblast